Hilltop House was formerly a luxurious hotel in Harpers Ferry, West Virginiia. 

Hilltop House is an American old-time radio soap opera. It debuted on November 1, 1937, was replaced by a spinoff, then was re-launched twice, with its final episode coming on July 30, 1957.

Versions
Hilltop House is dedicated to the women of America ... the story of a woman who must choose between love and the career of raising other women's children. — Epigraph of program. 
Radio historian Jim Cox wrote in his book, The Great Radio Soap Operas, "Listeners — most of them mothers themselves — related to the tenderness with which this tireless servant went about her tasks." A review of the program's premiere episode included the comment, "Both the script and the writing stood out as well above the average serial."

Hilltop House (1937 - 1941) 
Hilltop House'''s stories centered on Bess Johnson and the struggles that she faced as the person in charge of Hilltop House Orphanage.  Children were integral to the plots, and the stories usually dealt with the youngsters' interactions with adults. Financial problems and conflicts between the staff and members of the orphanage's board of directors also arose frequently. Sponsored by Palmolive soap, this version was broadcast on both CBS and Mutual beginning on November 1, 1937.  It left Mutual in 1938 but remained on CBS until March 28, 1941.

 The Story of Bess Johnson (1941 - 1942) 
In 1941, Hilltop House was replaced by a spinoff, The Story of Bess Johnson. The on-air premise for the change was that bigoted officials had dismissed Johnson from her position at the orphanage, and the new program would focus on Johnson as she looked for a new job and faced new dramatic developments.<ref>{{cite news |title='The Story of Bess Johnson Replaces 'Hilltop House', WHP |url=https://www.newspapers.com/clip/26233029/bess_johnson/ |work=Harrisburg Telegraph |date=March 29, 1941 |location=Pennsylvania, Harrisburg |page=25|via = Newspapers.com|accessdate = December 14, 2018}} </ref> The story behind the scenes was that the sponsor, Palmolive soap, changed advertising firms, and the new agency decided to reduce production costs by reducing the quality of the program. That led producer Edwin Wolfe to take Hilltop House off the air, whereupon the new advertising agency replaced it with The Story of Bess Johnson. Johnson left Hilltop House on a Friday, and on the following Monday she became superintendent of Mount Holly School for Girls. Kleenex tissues was the sponsor. When it debuted on March 31, 1941, the spinoff was broadcast on both NBC and CBS. At some point, it left CBS, and it ended on NBC on September 25, 1942.

In 1941, Eleanor Roosevelt participated in an episode of The Story of Bess Johnson. The plot had Roosevelt visiting Mount Holly School to "talk about many of the complexities now confronting the young women of America."

Hilltop House (1948 - 1955) 
On May 17, 1948, Miles Laboratories brought Hilltop House back to CBS. The orphanage was now headed by superintendent Grace Dolben, with Julie Erickson as her assistant. The program ran for seven years, with Pharmaco, Inc., replacing Miles as sponsor for the last year. It ended on July 1, 1955.

Hilltop House (1956 - 1957) 
After about a year's absence, Hilltop House returned for one more run on radio, debuting on September 3, 1956, on NBC. This time it faced competition from growing audiences for television, compounded by the shift of local radio stations away from soap operas. The show left the air on July 30, 1957.

Personnel
The table below shows characters in the three versions of Hilltop House and its spinoff, The Story of Bess Johnson.

Frank Gallop was the announcer. The producer was Edwin Wolfe, while the directors were Carlo De Angelo and Jack Rubin. Addy Richton and Lynn Stone (writing jointly as Adelaide Marston) wrote the scripts. Chester Kingsbury provided the music.

References

External links 
 
 "Hilltop House" — a short story in the August 1954 issue of TV Radio Mirror
 "In Living Portraits ... Hilltop House"  — a short story in the September 1949 issue of Radio and Television Mirror
 "No such thing as a problem child" — a short story in the May 1953 issue of Radio-TV Mirror

Logs
Partial log of episodes of Hilltop House from Jerry Haendiges Vintage Radio Logs
Partial log of episodes of Hilltop House from Old Time Radio Researchers Group
Partial log of episodes of Hilltop House from radioGOLDINdex

Streaming
Episodes of Hilltop House from Dumb.com
Episodes of Hilltop House from Old Time Radio Researchers Group library

1937 radio programme debuts
1957 radio programme endings
1930s American radio programs
1940s American radio programs
1950s American radio programs
CBS Radio programs
Mutual Broadcasting System programs
NBC radio programs
American radio soap operas
American radio dramas